The Don't Ask, Don't Tell Repeal Act of 2010 is a landmark United States federal statute enacted in December 2010 that established a process for ending the "don't ask, don't tell" (DADT) policy, thus allowing gay, lesbian, and bisexual people to serve openly in the United States Armed Forces. It ended the policy in place since 1993 that allowed them to serve only if they kept their sexual orientation secret and the military did not learn of their sexual orientation, which was controversial.

The Act established a process for ending the "don't ask, don't tell" policy.
The Act did not ban discrimination on the basis of sexual orientation in the military, as provided for in the proposed Military Readiness Enhancement Act.

President Barack Obama, Defense Secretary Leon Panetta, and Chairman of the Joint Chiefs of Staff Admiral Mike Mullen provided the certification required by the Act to Congress on July 22, 2011. Implementation of repeal was completed 60 days later, so that DADT was no longer policy .

Provisions 
According to the Congressional Research Service, the Act:

Background

DADT was controversial from the time it was implemented, but it became increasingly a matter of public debate after 2004. In July 2004, the American Psychological Association issued a statement that "Empirical evidence fails to show that sexual orientation is germane to any aspect of military effectiveness including unit cohesion, morale, recruitment and retention." In February 2005, the Government Accountability Office reported that DADT cost at least $95.4 million for recruiting and at least $95.1 million for training replacements for the 9,488 troops discharged from 1994 through 2003. In December 2006, Zogby International reported that a poll of military personnel conducted in October 2006 found that 26% favored allowing gays and lesbians to serve openly in the military, 37% were opposed, while 37% expressed no preference or were unsure. At a February 2, 2010 congressional hearing, Senator John McCain read from a letter signed by "over one thousand former general and flag officers". It said: "We firmly believe that this law, which Congress passed to protect good order, discipline and morale in the unique environment of the armed forces, deserves continued support."

Legislative history 
The Democratic leadership in both the House and Senate tried to end the "don't ask, don't tell" policy with an amendment to the Defense Authorization bill. On May 27, 2010, on a 234–194 vote, the U.S. House of Representatives approved the Murphy amendment to the National Defense Authorization Act for Fiscal Year 2011. It provided for repeal of the DADT policy and created a process for lifting the policy, including a U.S. Department of Defense study and certification by key officials that the change in policy would not harm military effectiveness, followed by a waiting period of 60 days. On the same day the U.S. Senate Armed Services Committee on a 16–12 vote advanced an identical measure to be included in the Defense Authorization Act. The amended defense bill passed the House on May 28, 2010. On September 21, 2010, John McCain led a successful (56 in favor, 43 opposed) filibuster against the debate on the Defense Authorization Act.

On November 30, 2010, the Department of Defense's Comprehensive Review Working Group (CRWG) on DADT repeal issued its formal report outlining a path to the implementation of repeal of DADT. The report indicated that there was low risk of service disruptions because of repeal of the ban. Gates encouraged Congress to act quickly to repeal the law so that the military could carefully adjust rather than face a court decision requiring it to lift the policy immediately. The United States Senate held two days of hearings on December 2 and 3, 2010, to consider the CRWG report. Defense Secretary Robert Gates, Joint Chiefs Chairman Michael Mullen urged immediate repeal. The heads of the Marine Corps, Army, and Navy all advised against immediate repeal and expressed varied views on its eventual repeal.

Democrats in Congress quickly scheduled hearings to consider repeal of the law. On December 3, the Joint Chiefs of Staff appeared before the Senate Armed Services Committee to testify about repeal. While the Vice Chairman of the Joint Chiefs of Staff, Chief of Naval Operations, and Commandant of the Coast Guard said repeal would cause minimal disruption, heads of the Army, Air Force, and Marines opposed repeal because it would cause additional stress on combat focused forces during war.

On December 9, 2010, another filibuster prevented debate on the Defense Authorization Act during the lame duck session of Congress.

On December 9, 2010, in reaction to the failure to open discussion on the Defense Authorization Act, Senators Joe Lieberman and Susan Collins introduced a bill that included the policy-related portions of the Defense Authorization Act that they considered more likely to pass as a stand-alone bill. The Washington Post compared it to a Hail Mary pass. The stand-alone bill was sponsored by Patrick Murphy and passed the House on a vote of 250 to 175 on December 15, 2010.

On December 18, 2010, the Senate voted to end debate on its version of the bill by a cloture vote of 63–33. Prior to the vote, Sen. Lieberman gave the final argument in favor of repealing DADT and Sen. McCain argued against repeal. The final Senate vote was held later that same day, with the measure passing by a vote of 65–31.

U.S. Secretary of Defense Robert Gates released a statement following the vote indicating that the planning for implementation of a policy repeal would begin right away, led by Under Secretary of Defense for Personnel and Readiness Clifford L. Stanley, and would continue until Gates certified that conditions were met for orderly repeal of the policy. President Barack Obama signed the bill into law on December 22, 2010.

Senate roll call

Implementation
Following enactment, the Department of Defense charged a committee led by Clifford Stanley to oversee its implementation. Stanley's committee commissioned a comprehensive review of current policies, the repeal, and whether the new status quo would be consistent with the goals of, in the words of Secretary of Defense Robert Gates, "military readiness, military effectiveness, unit cohesion, and recruiting and retention of the Armed Forces."

On January 29, 2011, the Pentagon released its plan for implementing the end of DADT. It called for a three-month period of training for all personnel, beginning in the third quarter of 2011. President Obama, Defense Secretary Leon Panetta, and Joint Chiefs of Staff Chairman Adm. Mike Mullen sent Congress the required certification that implementation of repeal would not have negative effect on military readiness and performance on July 22, 2011. Full implementation of the repeal occurred 60 days later on September 20, 2011.

Removal of legal discrimination 
The repeal of DADT did not alter the language of Article 125 of the Uniform Code of Military Justice, which banned sodomy by service members. This prohibition was removed upon enactment of the National Defense Authorization Act for Fiscal Year 2014.

The repeal of DADT also did not alter the status of same-sex-married service members, which was still unrecognized under the 1996 Defense of Marriage Act. On 14 August 2013, the Department of Defense (DoD) announced that it would provide spousal and family benefits to servicemembers in same-sex marriages on the same terms as it does to those in different-sex marriages; this was made retroactive to 26 June, when the Supreme Court decided in United States v. Windsor that Section 3 of DOMA, which barred U.S. military from extending those benefits to same-sex couples, was unconstitutional. From 13 September 2013, VA loans were extended to veterans in same-sex marriages. These decisions were affirmed in the 2015 ruling in Obergefell v. Hodges and the 2022 enactment of the Respect for Marriage Act.

References

External links
 Bill Summary & Status  –  111th Congress (2009–2010)  – H.R.2965
 In Historic Move, Senate Votes to Repeal "Don't Ask, Don't Tell" – video report by Democracy Now!
 Invocation delivered at Presidential Signing Ceremony for DADT Repeal, December 22, 2010.
 Rhode Island College LibGuide – Don't Ask, Don't Tell Repeal

2010 in LGBT history
2010 in military history
Acts of the 111th United States Congress
Don't ask, don't tell
LGBT law in the United States
Presidency of Barack Obama
United States federal civil rights legislation
United States federal defense and national security legislation
United States military law